The Association for Comparative Economic Studies (ACES) is the leading scholarly organization for the support of studies on comparative economic systems. Its global membership includes academics, policymakers, and other economists and political scientists employed by international agencies, governments and the private sector. The purpose of ACES is to provide scholarly exchange among persons interested in comparative studies of economic systems, institutions, and economic performance and development; and to further the growth of research and instruction on these topics.  ACES holds its annual meetings in conjunction with the Allied Social Science Associations and sponsors a full range of panels organized by its members. ACES sponsors and edits two well-known journals, the Journal of Comparative Economics; and Comparative Economic Studies.

References

External links
 

Economics societies